Chinese art is visual art that originated in or is practiced in China, Greater China or by Chinese artists. Art created by Chinese residing outside of China can also be considered a part of Chinese art when it is based in or draws on Chinese culture, heritage, and history. Early "Stone Age art" dates back to 10,000 BC, mostly consisting of simple pottery and sculptures. After that period, Chinese art, like Chinese history, was typically classified by the succession of ruling dynasties of Chinese emperors, most of which lasted several hundred years. The Palace Museum in Beijing and the National Palace Museum in Taipei contains extensive collections of Chinese art.

Chinese art is marked by an unusual degree of continuity within, and consciousness of, tradition, lacking an equivalent to the Western collapse and gradual recovery of Western classical styles of art. Decorative arts are extremely important in Chinese art, and much of the finest work was produced in large workshops or factories by essentially unknown artists, especially in Chinese ceramics.

Much of the best work in ceramics, textiles, carved lacquer were produced over a long period by the various Imperial factories or workshops, which as well as being used by the court was distributed internally and abroad on a huge scale to demonstrate the wealth and power of the Emperors. In contrast, the tradition of ink wash painting, practiced mainly by scholar-officials and court painters especially of landscapes, flowers, and birds, developed aesthetic values depending on the individual imagination of and objective observation by the artist that are similar to those of the West, but long pre-dated their development there. After contacts with Western art became increasingly important from the 19th century onwards, in recent decades China has participated with increasing success in worldwide contemporary art.

Painting 

Traditional Chinese painting involves essentially the same techniques as Chinese calligraphy and is done with a
brush dipped in black or colored ink; oils are not used. As with calligraphy, the most popular materials on which paintings are made of paper and silk. The finished work can be mounted on scrolls, such as hanging scrolls or handscrolls. Traditional painting can also be done on album sheets, walls, lacquerware, folding screens, and other media.

The two main techniques in Chinese painting are:
 Gong-bi (工筆), meaning "meticulous", uses highly detailed brushstrokes that delimits details very precisely. It is often highly coloured and usually depicts figural or narrative subjects.  It is often practised by artists working for the royal court or in independent workshops. Bird-and-flower paintings were often in this style.
 Ink and wash painting, in Chinese Shui-mo or (水墨) also loosely termed watercolour or brush painting, and also known as "literati painting", as it was one of the "four arts" of the Chinese Scholar-official class. In theory this was an art practised by gentlemen, a distinction that begins to be made in writings on art from the Song dynasty, though in fact the careers of leading exponents could benefit considerably. This style is also referred to as "xie yi" (寫意) or freehand style.

Artists from the Han (202 BC) to the Tang (618–906) dynasties mainly painted the human figure. Much of what is known of early Chinese figure painting comes from burial sites, where paintings were preserved on silk banners, lacquered objects, and tomb walls. Many early tomb paintings were meant to protect the dead or help their souls get to paradise. Others illustrated the teachings of the Chinese philosopher Confucius, or showed scenes of daily life.  Most Chinese portraits showed a formal full-length frontal view, and were used in the family in ancestor veneration. Imperial portraits were more flexible, but were generally not seen outside the court, and portraiture formed no part of Imperial propaganda, as in other cultures.

Many critics consider landscape to be the highest form of Chinese painting. The time from the Five Dynasties period to the Northern Song period (907–1127) is known as the "Great age of Chinese landscape". In the north, artists such as Jing Hao, Li Cheng, Fan Kuan, and Guo Xi painted pictures of towering mountains, using strong black lines, ink wash, and sharp, dotted brushstrokes to suggest rough rocks.  In the south, Dong Yuan, Juran, and other artists painted the rolling hills and rivers of their native countryside in peaceful scenes done with softer, rubbed brushwork. These two kinds of scenes and techniques became the classical styles of Chinese landscape painting.

Sculpture

Chinese ritual bronzes from the Shang and Western Zhou dynasties come from a period of over a thousand years from c. 1500 BC, and have exerted a continuing influence over Chinese art. They are cast with complex patterned and zoomorphic decoration, but avoid the human figure, unlike the huge figures only recently discovered at Sanxingdui. The spectacular Terracotta Army was assembled for the tomb of Qin Shi Huang, the first emperor of a unified China from 221 to 210 BC, as a grand imperial version of the figures long placed in tombs to enable the deceased to enjoy the same lifestyle in the afterlife as when alive, replacing actual sacrifices of very early periods. Smaller figures in pottery or wood were placed in tombs for many centuries afterwards, reaching a peak of quality in the Tang dynasty.

Native Chinese religions do not usually use cult images of deities, or even represent them, and large religious sculpture is nearly all Buddhist, dating mostly from the 4th to the 14th century, and initially using Greco-Buddhist models arriving via the Silk Road. Buddhism is also the context of all large portrait sculpture; in total contrast to some other areas in medieval China even painted images of the emperor were regarded as private. Imperial tombs have spectacular avenues of approach lined with real and mythological animals on a scale matching Egypt, and smaller versions decorate temples and palaces.  Small Buddhist figures and groups were produced to a very high quality in a range of media, as was relief decoration of all sorts of objects, especially in metalwork and jade. Sculptors of all sorts were regarded as artisans and very few names are recorded.

Ceramics

Chinese ceramic ware shows a continuous development since the pre-dynastic periods, and is one of the most significant forms of Chinese art. China is richly endowed with the raw materials needed for making ceramics. The first types of ceramics were made during the Palaeolithic era, and in later periods range from construction materials such as bricks and tiles, to hand-built pottery vessels fired in bonfires or kilns, to the sophisticated Chinese porcelain wares made for the imperial court. Most later Chinese ceramics, even of the finest quality, were made on an industrial scale, thus very few individual potters or painters are known. Many of the most renowned workshops were owned by or reserved for the Emperor, and large quantities of ceramics were exported as diplomatic gifts or for trade from an early date.

Decorative arts
As well as porcelain, a wide range of materials that were more valuable were worked and decorated with great skill for a range of uses or just for display. Chinese jade was attributed with magical powers, and was used in the Stone and Bronze Ages for large and impractical versions of everyday weapons and tools, as well as the bi disks and cong vessels.  Later a range of objects and small sculptures were carved in jade, a difficult and time-consuming technique. Bronze, gold and silver, rhinoceros horn, Chinese silk, ivory, lacquer and carved lacquer, cloisonne enamel and many other materials had specialist artists working in them. Cloisonne underwent an interesting process of artistic hybridization in China, particularly in the pieces promoted by missionaries and Chinese Christian communities.

Folding screens are often decorated with beautiful art; major themes include mythology, scenes of palace life, and nature. Materials such as wood panel, paper and silk are used in making folding screens. They were considered ideal ornaments for many painters to display their paintings and calligraphy. Many artists painted on paper or silk and applied it onto the folding screen. There were two distinct artistic folding screens mentioned in historical literature of the era.

Architecture

Chinese architecture refers to a style of architecture that has taken shape in East Asia over many centuries. Especially Japan, Korea, Vietnam and Ryukyu. The structural principles of Chinese architecture have remained largely unchanged, the main changes being only the decorative details. Since the Tang Dynasty, Chinese architecture has had a major influence on the architectural styles of Korea, Vietnam, and Japan.

From the Neolithic era Longshan Culture and Bronze Age era Erlitou culture, the earliest rammed earth fortifications exist, with evidence of timber architecture. The subterranean ruins of the palace at Yinxu dates back to the Shang Dynasty (c. 1600 BC–1046 BC). In historic China, architectural emphasis was laid upon the horizontal axis, in particular the construction of a heavy platform and a large roof that floats over this base, with the vertical walls not as well emphasized. This contrasts Western architecture, which tends to grow in height and depth. Chinese architecture stresses the visual impact of the width of the buildings. The deviation from this standard is the tower architecture of the Chinese tradition, which began as a native tradition and was eventually influenced by the Buddhist building for housing religious sutras — the stupa — which came from Nepal. Ancient Chinese tomb model representations of multiple story residential towers and watchtowers date to the Han Dynasty (202 BC–220 AD). However, the earliest extant Buddhist Chinese pagoda is the Songyue Pagoda, a 40 m (131 ft) tall circular-based brick tower built in Henan province in the year 523 AD. From the 6th century onwards, stone-based structures become more common, while the earliest are from stone and brick arches found in Han Dynasty tombs. The Zhaozhou Bridge built from 595 to 605 AD is China's oldest extant stone bridge, as well as the world's oldest fully stone open-spandrel segmental arch bridge.

The vocational trade of architect, craftsman, and engineer was not as highly respected in premodern Chinese society as the scholar-bureaucrats who were drafted into the government by the civil service examination system. Much of the knowledge about early Chinese architecture was passed on from one tradesman to his son or associative apprentice. However, there were several early treatises on architecture in China, with encyclopedic information on architecture dating back to the Han Dynasty. The height of the classical Chinese architectural tradition in writing and illustration can be found in the Yingzao Fashi, a building manual written by 1100 and published by Li Jie (1065–1110) in 1103. In it there are numerous and meticulous illustrations and diagrams showing the assembly of halls and building components, as well as classifying structure types and building components.

There were certain architectural features that were reserved solely for buildings built for the Emperor of China. One example is the use of yellow roof tiles; yellow having been the Imperial color, yellow roof tiles still adorn most of the buildings within the Forbidden City. The Temple of Heaven, however, uses blue roof tiles to symbolize the sky. The roofs are almost invariably supported by brackets, a feature shared only with the largest of religious buildings. The wooden columns of the buildings, as well as the surface of the walls, tend to be red in colour.

Many current Chinese architectural designs follow post-modern and western styles.

Chinoiserie 

Chinoiserie is the European interpretation and imitation of Chinese and East Asian artistic traditions, especially in the decorative arts, garden design, architecture, literature, theatre, and music. The aesthetic of Chinoiserie has been expressed in different ways depending on the region. Its acknowledgement derives from the current of Orientalism, which studied Far East cultures from a historical, philological, anthropological, philosophical and religious point of view. First appearing in the 17th century, this trend was popularized in the 18th century due to the rise in trade with China and East Asia.

As a style, chinoiserie is related to the Rococo style. Both styles are characterized by exuberant decoration, asymmetry, a focus on materials, and stylized nature and subject matter that focuses on leisure and pleasure. Chinoiserie focuses on subjects that were thought by colonial-era Europeans to be typical of Chinese culture.

Botanical art

History and development

Neolithic pottery

Early forms of art in China are found in the Neolithic Yangshao culture, which dates back to the 6th millennium BC. Archeological findings such as those at the Banpo have revealed that the Yangshao made pottery; early ceramics were unpainted and most often cord-marked. The first decorations were fish and human faces, but these eventually evolved into symmetrical-geometric abstract designs, some painted.

The most distinctive feature of Yangshao culture was the extensive use of painted pottery, especially human facial, animal, and geometric designs. Unlike the later Longshan culture, the Yangshao culture did not use pottery wheels in pottery making. Excavations have found that children were buried in painted pottery jars.

Jade culture

The Liangzhu culture was the last Neolithic Jade culture in the Yangtze River Delta and was spaced over a period of about 1,300 years.  The Jade from this culture is characterized by finely worked, large ritual jades such as Cong cylinders, Bi discs, Yue axes and also pendants and decorations in the form of chiseled open-work plaques, plates and representations of small birds, turtles and fish. The Liangzhu Jade has a white, milky bone-like aspect due to its Tremolite rock origin and influence of water-based fluids at the burial sites.

Bronze casting 

The Bronze Age in China began with the Xia dynasty. Examples from this period have been recovered from ruins of the Erlitou culture, in Shanxi, and include complex but unadorned utilitarian objects.  In the following Shang dynasty more elaborate objects, including many ritual vessels, were crafted.  The Shang are remembered for their bronze casting, noted for its clarity of detail. Shang bronzesmiths usually worked in foundries outside the cities to make ritual vessels, and sometimes weapons and chariot fittings as well. The bronze vessels were receptacles for storing or serving various solids and liquids used in the performance of sacred ceremonies. Some forms such as the ku and jue can be very graceful, but the most powerful pieces are the ding, sometimes described as having an "air of ferocious majesty".

It is typical of the developed Shang style that all available space is decorated, most often with stylized forms of real and imaginary animals. The most common motif is the taotie, which shows a mythological being presented frontally as though squashed onto a horizontal plane to form a symmetrical design. The early significance of taotie is not clear, but myths about it existed around the late Zhou dynasty. It was considered to be variously a covetous man banished to guard a corner of heaven against evil monsters; or a monster equipped with only a head which tries to devour men but hurts only itself.

The function and appearance of bronzes changed gradually from the Shang to the Zhou. They shifted from been used in religious rites to more practical purposes. By the Warring States period, bronze vessels had become objects of aesthetic enjoyment. Some were decorated with social scenes, such as from a banquet or hunt; whilst others displayed abstract patterns inlaid with gold, silver, or precious and semiprecious stones.

Bronze artifacts also have significant meaning and roles in Han Dynasty as well. People used them for funerary purposes which reflect the aesthetic and artistic qualities of Han Dynasty. Many bronze vessels excavated from tombs in Jiangsu Province, China have various shapes like Ding, Hu, and Xun which represent traditional Chinese aesthete. These vessels are classical representations of Chinese celestial art forms which play a great role in ancient Chinese's communication with spirits of their ancestors. Other than the vessels, bronze weapons, daily items, and musical instruments are also found in royal Han families' tomb in Jiangsu. Being able to put a full set of Bianzhong in ones tomb signifies his or her status and class in Han Dynasty since this particular type of instrument is only acquired and owned by royal and wealth families. Apparently, Bianzhong and music are also used as a path for the Han rulers to communication with their Gods. The excavation of Bianzhong, a typical and royal instrument found in ancient China, emphasizes the development of complex music systems in Han Dynasty. The set of Bianzhong can vary in many cases; for example, a specific excavation of Bianzhong from Jiangsu Province include different sets of bells, like Niuzhong and Yongzhong bells, and many of them appear in animal forms like the dragon, a traditional Chinese spiritual animal.

Shang bronzes became appreciated as works of art from the Song dynasty, when they were collected and prized not only for their shape and design but also for the various green, blue green, and even reddish patinas created by chemical action as they lay buried in the ground. The study of early Chinese bronze casting is a specialized field of art history.

Chu and Southern culture 
A rich source of art in early China was the state of Chu, which developed in the Yangtze River valley. Excavations of Chu tombs have found painted wooden sculptures, jade disks, glass beads, musical instruments, and an assortment of lacquerware. Many of the lacquer objects are finely painted, red on black or black on red. A site in Changsha, Hunan province, has revealed some of the oldest paintings on silk discovered to date.

Early Imperial China (221 BC–AD 220)

Qin art 

During the Qin Dynasty, Chinese font, measurement systems, currency were all standardized in order to bring further unification. The Great Wall of China was expanded as a defensive construction against the northern intruders. 
The Terracotta Army, inside the Mausoleum of the First Qin Emperor, consists of more than 7,000 life-size tomb terra-cotta figures of warriors and horses buried with the self-proclaimed first Emperor of Qin (Qin Shi Huang) in 210–209 BC. The figures were painted before being placed into the vault. The original colors were visible when the pieces were first unearthed. However, exposure to air caused the pigments to fade, so today the unearthed figures appear terracotta in color. The figures are in several poses including standing infantry and kneeling archers, as well as charioteers with horses. Each figure's head appears to be unique, showing a variety of facial features and expressions as well as hair styles. The spectacular realism displayed by the sculptures is an evidence of the advancement of art during the Qin Dynasty.

A music instrument called Qin zither was developed during Qin Dynasty.
The aesthetic components have always been as important as the functional parts on a musical instrument in Chinese history. The Qin zither has seven strings. Although Qin zither can sometimes remind people of corruptive history times, it is often considered as a delivery of peace and harmony.

Han art 
The Han dynasty was known for jade burial suits. One of the earliest known depictions of a landscape in Chinese art comes from a pair of hollow-tile door panels from a Western Han dynasty tomb near Zhengzhou, dated 60 BC. A scene of continuous depth recession is conveyed by the zigzag of lines representing roads and garden walls, giving the impression that one is looking down from the top of a hill. This artistic landscape scene was made by the repeated impression of standard stamps on the clay while it was still soft and not yet fired. However, the oldest known landscape art scene tradition in the classical sense of painting is a work by Zhan Ziqian of the Sui dynasty (581–618).

Other than jade artifacts, bronze is another favorite medium for artists since it is hard and durable. Bronze mirrors have been mass-produced in Han Dynasty(206 BC-220 AD), and almost every tomb excavated that has been dated as Han Dynasty has mirror in the burial. The reflective side is usually made by a composition of bronze, copper, tin, and lead. The word "mirror" means "to reflect" or "to look into" in Chinese, so bronze mirrors have been used as a trope for reflecting the reality. The ancient Chinese believe that mirror can act as a representation of the reality, which could make them more aware of the current situation; also, mirrors are used as a media to convey or present a reflection of the past events. The bronze mirrors made in Han Dynasty always have complex decorations on their non-reflective side; some of them consist narratives that tell stories. The narratives themselves always reflect the common but essential theories to the Han people's lives.

Period of division (220–581)

Influence of Buddhism 

Buddhism arrived in China around the 1st century AD (although there are some traditions about a monk visiting China during Asoka's reign), and through to the 8th century it became very active and creative in the development of Buddhist art, particularly in the area of statuary. Receiving this distant religion, China soon incorporated strong Chinese traits in its artistic expression.

In the fifth to sixth century the Northern dynasties, rather removed from the original sources of inspiration, tended to develop rather symbolic and abstract modes of representation, with schematic lines. Their style is also said to be solemn and majestic. The lack of corporeality of this art, and its distance from the original Buddhist objective of expressing the pure ideal of enlightenment in an accessible, realistic manner, progressively led to a research towards more naturalism and realism, leading to the expression of Tang Buddhist art.

Calligraphy 
In ancient China, painting and calligraphy were the most highly appreciated arts in court circles and were produced almost exclusively by amateurs, aristocrats and scholar-officials who alone had the leisure to perfect the technique and sensibility necessary for great brushwork. Calligraphy was thought to be the highest and purest form of painting. The implements were the brush, made of animal hair, and black ink made from pine soot and animal glue. Writing as well as painting was done on silk. But after the invention of paper in the 1st century, silk was gradually replaced by the new and cheaper material. Original writings by famous calligraphers have been greatly valued throughout China's history and are mounted on scrolls and hung on walls in the same way that paintings are.

Wang Xizhi was a famous Chinese calligrapher who lived in the 4th century AD. His most famous work is the Lanting Xu, the preface to a collection of poems. The script was often celebrated as the high point of the semi-cursive "Running Style" in the history of Chinese calligraphy.

Wei Shuo was a well-known calligrapher of the Eastern Jin dynasty who established consequential rules about the Regular Script.  Her well-known works include Famous Concubine Inscription (名姬帖 Ming Ji Tie) and The Inscription of Wei-shi He'nan (衛氏和南帖 Wei-shi He'nan Tie).

Painting 

Gu Kaizhi is a celebrated painter of ancient China born in Wuxi. He wrote three books about painting theory: On Painting (畫論), Introduction of Famous Paintings of Wei and Jin Dynasties (魏晉名畫記) and Painting Yuntai Mountain (畫雲臺山記). He wrote, "In figure paintings the clothes and the appearances were not very important. The eyes were the spirit and the decisive factor."
Three of Gu's paintings still survive today: Admonitions of the Instructress to the Court Ladies, Nymph of the Luo River (洛神賦), and Wise and Benevolent Women.

There are other examples of Jin dynasty painting from tombs. This includes the Seven Sages of the Bamboo Grove, painted on a brick wall of a tomb located near modern Nanjing and now found in the Shaanxi Provincial Museum. Each of the figures are labeled and shown either drinking, writing, or playing a musical instrument. Other tomb paintings also depict scenes of daily life, such as men plowing fields with teams of oxen.

The Sui and Tang dynasties (581–960)

Buddhist architecture and sculpture 
Following a transition under the Sui dynasty, Buddhist sculpture of the Tang evolved towards a markedly lifelike expression. As a consequence of the dynasty's openness to foreign trade and influences through the Silk Road, Tang dynasty Buddhist sculpture assumed a rather classical form, inspired by the Greco-Buddhist art of Central Asia.

However, foreign influences came to be negatively perceived towards the end of the Tang dynasty. In the year 845, the Tang emperor Wu-Tsung outlawed all "foreign" religions (including Christian Nestorianism, Zoroastrianism and Buddhism) in order to support the indigenous Taoism. He confiscated Buddhist possessions and forced the faith to go underground, therefore affecting the ulterior development of the religion and its arts in China.

Glazed or painted earthenware Tang dynasty tomb figures are famous, and well-represented in museums around the world. Most wooden Tang sculptures have not survived, though representations of the Tang international style can still be seen in Nara, Japan. The longevity of stone sculpture has proved much greater. Some of the finest examples can be seen at Longmen, near Luoyang (Henan), Yungang near Datong (Shanxi), and Bingling Temple in Gansu.
One of the most famous Buddhist Chinese pagodas is the Giant Wild Goose Pagoda, built in 652 AD.

Painting 

Beginning in the Tang dynasty (618–907), the primary subject matter of painting was the landscape, known as shanshui (mountain water) painting. In these landscapes, usually monochromatic and sparse, the purpose was not to reproduce exactly the appearance of nature but rather to grasp an emotion or atmosphere so as to catch the "rhythm" of nature.

Painting in the traditional style involved essentially the same techniques as calligraphy and was done with a brush dipped in black or colored ink; oils were not used. As with calligraphy, the most popular materials on which paintings were made were paper and silk. The finished works were then mounted on scrolls, which could be hung or rolled up. Traditional painting was also done in albums, on walls, lacquer work, and in other media.

Dong Yuan was an active painter in the Southern Tang Kingdom. He was known for both figure and landscape paintings, and exemplified the elegant style which would become the standard for brush painting in China over the next 900 years. As with many artists in China, his profession was as an official where he studied the existing styles of Li Sixun and Wang Wei. However, he added to the number of techniques, including more sophisticated perspective, use of pointillism and crosshatching to build up vivid effect.

Zhan Ziqian was a painter during the Sui dynasty. His only painting in existence is Strolling About In Spring arranged mountains perspectively. Because pure landscape paintings are hardly seen in Europe until the 17th century, Strolling About In Spring may well be the world's first landscape painting.

The Song and Yuan dynasties (960–1368)

Song painting 
During the Song dynasty (960–1279), landscapes of more subtle expression appeared; immeasurable distances were conveyed through the use of blurred outlines, mountain contours disappearing into the mist, and impressionistic treatment of natural phenomena. Emphasis was placed on the spiritual qualities of the painting and on the ability of the artist to reveal the inner harmony of man and nature, as perceived according to Taoist and Buddhist concepts.

Liang Kai was a Chinese painter who lived in the 13th century (Song dynasty). He called himself "Madman Liang", and he spent his life drinking and painting. Eventually, he retired and became a Zen monk. Liang is credited with inventing the Zen school of Chinese art. Wen Tong was a painter who lived in the 11th century. He was famous for ink paintings of bamboo.  He could hold two brushes in one hand and paint two different distanced bamboos simultaneously. He did not need to see the bamboo while he painted them because he had seen a lot of them.

Zhang Zeduan was a notable painter for his horizontal Along the River During Qingming Festival landscape and cityscape painting. It is considered one of China's most renowned paintings and has had many well-known remakes throughout Chinese history. Other famous paintings include The Night Revels of Han Xizai, originally painted by the Southern Tang artist Gu Hongzhong in the 10th century, while the well-known version of his painting is a 12th-century remake of the Song dynasty. This is a large horizontal handscroll of a domestic scene showing men of the gentry class being entertained by musicians and dancers while enjoying food, beverage, and wash basins provided by maidservants. In 2000, the modern artist Wang Qingsong created a parody of this painting with a long, horizontal photograph of people in modern clothing making similar facial expressions, poses, and hand gestures as the original painting.

Yuan painting 

With the fall of the Song dynasty in 1279, and the subsequent dislocation caused by the establishment of the Yuan dynasty by the Mongol conquerors, many court and literary artists retreated from social life, and returned to nature, through landscape paintings, and by renewing the "blue and green" style of the Tang era.

Wang Meng was one such painter, and one of his most famous works is the Forest Grotto. Zhao Mengfu was a Chinese scholar, painter and calligrapher during the Yuan dynasty. His rejection of the refined, gentle brushwork of his era in favor of the cruder style of the 8th century is considered to have brought about a revolution that created the modern Chinese landscape painting. There was also the vivid and detailed works of art by Qian Xuan (1235–1305), who had served the Song court, and out of patriotism refused to serve the Mongols, instead turning to painting. He was also famous for reviving and reproducing a more Tang dynasty style of painting.

The later Yuan dynasty is characterized by the work of the so-called "Four Great Masters". The most notable of these was Huang Gongwang (1269–1354) whose cool and restrained landscapes were admired by contemporaries, and by the Chinese literati painters of later centuries. Another of great influence was Ni Zan (1301–1374), who frequently arranged his compositions with a strong and distinct foreground and background, but left the middle-ground as an empty expanse. This scheme was frequently to be adopted by later Ming and Qing dynasty painters.

Pottery
Chinese porcelain is made from a hard paste made of the clay kaolin and a feldspar called petuntse, which cements the vessel and seals any pores. China has become synonymous with high-quality porcelain. Most china pots comes from the city of Jingdezhen in China's Jiangxi province. Jingdezhen porcelain, under a variety of names, has been central to porcelain production in China since at least the Yuan dynasty.

Late imperial China (1368–1911)

Ming painting 

Under the Ming dynasty, Chinese culture bloomed. Narrative painting, with a wider color range and a much busier composition than the Song paintings, was immensely popular during the time.

Wen Zhengming (1470–1559) developed the style of the Wu school in Suzhou, which dominated Chinese painting during the 16th century.

European culture began to make an impact on Chinese art during this period. The Jesuit priest Matteo Ricci visited Nanjing with many Western artworks, which were influential in showing different techniques of perspective and shading.

Early Qing painting 
The early Qing dynasty developed in two main strands: the Orthodox school, and the Individualist painters, both of which followed the theories of Dong Qichang, but emphasizing very different aspects.

The "Four Wangs", including Wang Jian (1598–1677) and Wang Shimin (1592–1680), were particularly renowned in the Orthodox school, and sought inspiration in recreating the past styles, especially the technical skills in brushstrokes and calligraphy of ancient masters. The younger Wang Yuanqi (1642–1715) ritualized the approach of engaging with and drawing inspiration from a work of an ancient master. His own works were often annotated with his theories of how his painting relates to the master's model.

The Individualist painters included Bada Shanren (1626–1705) and Shitao (1641–1707). They drew more from the revolutionary ideas of transcending the tradition to achieve an original individualistic styles; in this way they were more faithfully following the way of Dong Qichang than the Orthodox school (who were his official direct followers.)

Painters outside of the literati-scholar and aristocratic traditions also gained renown, with some artists creating paintings to sell for money. These included Ma Quan (late 17th–18th century), who depicted common flowers, birds, and insects that were not typical subject matter among scholars. Such painters were, however, not separated from formal schools of painting, but were usually well-versed in artistic styles and techniques. Ma Quan, for example, modelled her brushwork on Song dynasty examples. Simultaneously, the boneless technique, thought to have originated as a preparatory step when painting gold-line images during the Tang, was continued by painters like Yun Shouping (1633–1690) and his descendant Yun Bing.

As the techniques of color printing were perfected, illustrated manuals on the art of painting began to be published. Jieziyuan Huazhuan (Manual of the Mustard Seed Garden), a five-volume work first published in 1679, has been in use as a technical textbook for artists and students ever since.

Late Qing Art 
Nianhua were a form of colored woodblock prints in China, depicting images for decoration during the Chinese New Year. In the 19th century Nianhua were used as news mediums.

Shanghai School 
The Shanghai School is a very important Chinese school of traditional arts during the Qing dynasty and the 20th century. Under efforts of masters from this school, traditional Chinese art reached another climax and continued to the present in forms of "Chinese painting" (中國畫), or guohua (國畫) for short.  The Shanghai School challenged and broke the literati tradition of Chinese art, while also paying technical homage to the ancient masters and improving on existing traditional techniques. Members of this school were themselves educated literati who had come to question their very status and the purpose of art, and had anticipated the impending modernization of Chinese society. In an era of rapid social change, works from the Shanghai School were widely innovative and diverse, and often contained thoughtful yet subtle social commentary. The best known figures from this school are Ren Xiong, Ren Bonian, Zhao Zhiqian, Wu Changshuo, Sha Menghai, Pan Tianshou, Fu Baoshi, He Tianjian, and Xie Zhiliu.  Other well-known painters include Wang Zhen, XuGu, Zhang Xiong, Hu Yuan, and Yang Borun.

New China art (1912–1949)

Modern Art Movement 
The movement to modernize Chinese art started toward the end of the Qing Dynasty.  The traditional art form started to lose its appeal as the feudalistic structure of the society was dissolving. The modern view of the world had to be expressed in a different form.  The explorations went on two main paths:  one was to draw from the past to enrich the present ( 汲古潤今)*, the other was to "learn the new methods" (學習新法).*

Draw from the Past 

The literati art for the social elite was not appealing to the bourgeois patrons. Wu Changshuo 吳昌碩 (1844–1927) was among the Shanghai-based artists responsible for flowers and plants as the subject matter. His paintings used bold colors and energetic brush strokes, making them more accessible to the general public. Qi Baishi 齊白石 (1864–1957) painted images like crabs and shrimps that were even more approachable to the common people. Huang Binhong 黄宾虹 (1865–1955) denounced the literati paintings of the Qing dynasty and created his own style of landscape paintings by extensive investigations in Chinese art history. Zhang Daqian 張大千 (1899–1983) used wall paintings in Dunhuang 敦煌 caves to help him move beyond the literati tradition.

Learn New Methods 

The Lingnan School 岭南画派 made some borrowings from the language of Western art in their ink paintings.   Gao Jianfu 高剑父(1879–1951), one of the founders of Lingnan School, was an active participant in the revolutionary movement of Sun Yat-sen 孫中山 (1866–1925).  He was innovative in that he intended to use his paintings to highlight national issues, a medium for positive change in society.
A more radical style change started with Kang Youwei 康有為(1858–1927), a reformer who admired the more reality-based art of the Song dynasty.  He believed that Chinese art could be rejuvenated by employing the reality-oriented art techniques of Europe. Xu Beihong徐悲鴻 (1895–1953) took this idea to heart and went to Paris to acquire the necessary skills. Liu Haisu刘海粟(1896–1994), on the other hand, went to Japan to learn western techniques. Both Xu, and Liu became presidents of prestigious art schools, instilling new concepts and skills in the next generation of artists. Cai Yuanpei 蔡元培 (1868–1940) was one of the leaders in the "New Culture Movement" 新文化运动.  Those involved believed that intellectual activities should benefit all, not just the elites.  Cai's belief that art could play a public, socially reformist role was adopted by Lin Fengmian林風眠(1900–1991).

Together with Yan Wenliang 顏文樑(1893–1988), Xu, Liu, and Lin were considered the "Four Great Academy Presidents" 四大校長, who spearheaded the national modern art movement.  However the subsequent upheaval caused by the Sino-Japanese war and the civil war did not allow this movement to grow.  The Chinese modern art movement after the war developed differently in the four the regions: the Mainland, Taiwan, Hong Kong, and overseas.

Postwar Chinese Art (1949–1976) 
The postwar era is roughly from 1949, the end of Chinese civil war, to 1976, the opening of mainland China to the outside world..

The Mainland 
The postwar era in mainland China could be divided into two periods:  1949 to 1966 is generally called  "The 17 Years"; 1966 to 1976 is the period of the "Cultural Revolution".

The 17 Years 
Chinese artists adopted social realism as a form of expression; it was a combination of revolutionary realism and revolutionary romanticism.  Artwork was not valued on its own terms but was subservient to a political purpose.  According to Mao Zedong, art should be a "powerful weapon for uniting and educating the people, fighting and destroying the enemy". Praising political leaders and celebrating the achievements of socialism became the theme of all artwork. Western art forms, including Cubism, Fauvism, Abstraction, and Expressionism were deemed superficial and were categorized as formalism.

The biggest blow to art was the Anti-Rightist Campaign of 1957.  Artists who were labeled as rightists were stripped of their right to create and even their jobs, and worse,  the social standing of the artists and their families was placed at the lowest level, causing great mental suffering.

Some influential paintings from this period are:

Li Keran, Reddinging of Ten Thousand Mountains (李可染《万山红遍》)
Huang Wei, The Snowstorm (黄胄《洪荒风雪》)
Dong Xiwen, The Founding Ceremony of the Nation (董希文《开国大典》) had gone through several revisions, due to the changing political situation.   Gao Gang was taken out when he went out of favor, Liu Shaoqi was replaced by Dong Biwu for a while, then the prototype was restored.

The Cultural Revolution 
These ten years could also be called the "Ten Years of Calamity" (十年浩劫). In order to destroy everything that supported the old social order, countless temples, historic sites, artworks, and books, were ravaged and burnt. During this period the portrait of Mao and propaganda posters of revolution were everywhere. Anything that was remotely suspected of being out of line was destroyed, and the person behind it was prosecuted. For example, Owl by Huang Youyu had one eye open and one eye closed; it was deemed an expression of dissatisfaction with current events. Zong Qixiang's painting, which shows three tigers, was deemed critical of the leader Lin Biao, whose name contained a character that had three tigers in it. Residual Lotus by Li Kuchan had eight lotus flowers; it was deemed to be critical of the eight communist approved movies (样板戏). Many prominent artists were persecuted during this time. For example, Yan, Xu, Liu, and Lin, the "Four Great Academy Presidents" 四大校長 (except for Xu who died before the Cultural Revolution), were all prosecuted and jailed, and all their work was destroyed during this time.
However, despite the difficult environment, some noteworthy paintings were created. The following are some examples:

Chen Yifei, The Yellow River (陈逸飞《黄河颂》)
Sun Jingbo, New Song by Ah Xi (孙景波《阿细新歌》)

Taiwan 

Because of its history, traditional Chinese art does not have strong roots in Taiwan. The art forms in Taiwan were generally decorative, until there were youths growing up under the Japanese occupation received formal art education in Japan. Not burdened with traditional art form, their exploration generally followed the path of "learning the new methods" (學習新法). When the Nationalists arrived in Taiwan, a group of ambitious youths, who came with the Nationalists, continued the modern art movement. The most notable were the Fifth Moon Group 五月畫會 and the Ton-Fan Art Group東方畫會.

Fifth Moon Group五月畫會 

The original members of the group were alumni with the art majors from the Academic Teachers College師範大學 (the only university with an art major at the time). Their first intention was to show that the effort to create new art was worthwhile in itself, even if it did not directly enhance art pedagogy. (The faculty member that provided the most support was 廖繼春, a Taiwanese native who received training abroad in Japan.) Later, it became a movement to modernize Chinese art.

The members of the Fifth Moon Group studied western art movements, and concluded that the abstract art form was the best medium for modern Chinese art. They felt the best the Chinese paintings were ones that de-emphasized realistic representation, and emphasized atmosphere and "vividness" 氣韻生動, which comes from the brush strokes and the natural interaction between ink and paper. To further that idea, one does not need representation of objects in painting, or strictly use ink and paper. The beauty of a painting can be appreciated directly from the forms, textures, and colors on the canvas without their relation to real objects.
The group was active from 1957 to 1972. The main members are Liu Guosong 劉國松, Chuang Che 莊喆, Hu Chi-Chung胡奇中, Fong Chung-ray 馮鍾睿, and Han Hsiang-ning 韓湘寧. The following are a sample of their paintings from that period:

Liu Guosong, 1964
Chuang Che, 1965

Ton-Fan Art Group東方畫會 
The members of this group were students who attended private art classes offered by 李仲生, a mainland-born artist who had been one of the active participants in the modern art movement.  He and a number of mainland artists who painted in a western style continued the modern art movement by publishing magazines and writing articles to introduce modern art to Taiwan. 李仲生 teaching style was unconventional and socratic in nature.  
The original intention of the group was to introduce modern art to the public. They believed there should be no restriction on the form or style of a modern Chinese painting, as long as the painting expressed meaning that was Chinese in nature. The group was active from 1957 to 1971. The main members were: 霍剛Ho Kan, 李元佳Li Yuan-chia, 吳昊Wu Hao, 歐陽文苑Oyan Wen-Yuen, 夏陽Hsia Yan, 蕭勤Hsiao Chin, 陳道明Tommy Chen, 蕭明賢Hsiao Ming-Hsien. The following are a sample of their paintings from that period:

Ho Kan, 1967
Hsia Yan, 1965
Hsiao Chin, 1955

Hong Kong 

Hong Kong was a British colony from 1842 to 1997. The local art organizations were mostly run by Westerners who outnumbered Chinese painters until a large migration of Chinese from Southern China during Sino-Japanese War. Innovative art colleges were established after the war. The shows organized by local artists started in the early 1960s. After a reaction against the traditional Western artistic practices of the 1940s and the 1950s, some experimental works that combined both western and eastern techniques were made. Then came the call for a return to Chinese traditional art and the creation of forms of art that Hong Kong could call its own. The trend was led by Lui Shou Kwan 呂壽琨. Some western concepts were incorporated into his Chinese ink paintings.

Lui Shou Kwan, 1965

Overseas

Paris 
Many Chinese artists went to study western art in Paris in the early 1900s, for example: Fang Ganmin 方幹民, Wu Dayu 吳大羽, Ong Schan Tchow 翁占秋, Lin Fengmian 林風眠, Yan Wenliang 顏文樑, Wu Guanzhong 吳冠中, Zao Wou-Ki 趟無極. All except Zao completed their education before 1949 and returned to become leaders in the modern art movement. (Zao happened to be in Paris in 1949 and did not return.) Some Chinese artists went to stay there because of the rich international art environment, for example:  Sanyu 常玉, Pang Yuliang 潘張玉良, 朱德群Chu Teh Chun. Zao, Sanyu, Pang, and Chu all had shows in Paris and the Republic. All their paintings had varying degrees of Chinese elements in them. These artists not only had a profound influence in Chinese modern art, but they also continued to engage Parisians with modern art from the East.

Zao Wou-Ki, 1959

United States 
Li Tiefu 李鐵夫 (1869–1952) was an accomplished oil painter educated in Canada and the United States. He was an active participant in the revolutionary movement of Sun Yat-sen 孫中山 (1866–1925).

Zeng Youhe 曾佑和 (1925–2017) was born in Beijing.  She started receiving international recognition in 1946, when Michael Sullivan began praising and writing about her work. Zeng moved to Honolulu in 1949 and visited Hong Kong and Taiwan in 1960. Like those of the Fifth Moon Group 五月畫會, her paintings were abstract; but the flavor of traditional Chinese ink paintings were not as pronounced.

Zeng Youhe, 1961

Redevelopment (mid-1980s – 1990s)

Contemporary art

Contemporary Chinese art (Zhongguo Dangdai Yishu) often referred to as Chinese avant-garde art, continued to develop since the 1980s as an outgrowth of modern art developments post-Cultural Revolution. 

Contemporary Chinese art fully incorporates painting, film, video, photography, and performance. Until recently, art exhibitions deemed controversial have been routinely shut down by police, and performance artists in particular faced the threat of arrest in the early 1990s. More recently there has been greater tolerance by the Chinese government, though many internationally acclaimed artists are still restricted from media exposure at home or have exhibitions ordered closed. Leading contemporary visual artists include Ai Weiwei, Cai Guoqiang, Cai Jin, Chan Shengyao, Concept 21, Ding Yi, Fang Lijun, Fu Wenjun, He Xiangyu, Huang Yan, Huang Yong Ping, Han Yajuan, Kong Bai Ji, Li Hongbo, Li Hui, Liu Bolin, Lu Shengzhong, Ma Liuming, Qiu Deshu, Qiu Shihua, Shen Fan, Shen Shaomin, Shi Jinsong, Song Dong, Li Wei, Wang Guangyi, Wenda Gu, Xu Bing, Yang Zhichao, Zhan Wang, Zheng Lianjie, Zhang Dali, Zhang Xiaogang, Zhang Huan, Zhu Yu, Wu Shaoxiang, Ma Kelu, Ding Fang, Shang Yang, Gao Minglu and Guo Jian.

Visual art
Beginning in the late 1980s there was unprecedented exposure for younger Chinese visual artists in the west to some degree through the agency of curators based outside the country such as Hou Hanru. Local curators within the country such as Gao Minglu and critics such as Li Xianting (栗憲庭) reinforced this promotion of particular brands of painting that had recently emerged, while also spreading the idea of art as a strong social force within Chinese culture. There was some controversy as critics identified these imprecise representations of contemporary Chinese art as having been constructed out of personal preferences, a kind of programmatized artist-curator relationship that only further alienated the majority of the avant-garde from Chinese officialdom and western art market patronage.

Art market

Today, the market for Chinese art, both antique and contemporary, is widely reported to be among the hottest and fastest-growing in the world, attracting buyers all over the world.  The Voice of America reported in 2006 that modern Chinese art is raking in record prices both internationally and in domestic markets, some experts even fearing the market might be overheating. The Economist reported that Chinese art has become the latest darling in the world market according to the record sales from Sotheby's and Christie's, the biggest fine-art auction houses.

Contemporary Chinese art saw record sales throughout the 2000s. In 2007, it was estimated that 5 of the world's 10 best selling living artists at art auction were from China, with artists such as Zhang Xiaogang whose works were sold for a total of $56.8 million at auction in 2007. In terms of buying-market, China overtook France in the late 2000s as the world's third-largest art market, after the United States and the United Kingdom, due to the growing middle-class in the country. Sotheby's noted that contemporary Chinese art has rapidly changed the contemporary Asian art world into one of the most dynamic sectors on the international art market. During the global economic crisis, the contemporary Asian art market and the contemporary Chinese art market experienced a slow down in late 2008.  The market for Contemporary Chinese and Asian art saw a major revival in late 2009 with record level sales at Christie's.

For centuries largely made-up of European and American buyers, the international buying market for Chinese art has also begun to be dominated by Chinese dealers and collectors in recent years. It was reported in 2011, China has become the world's second biggest market for art and antiques, accounting for 23 percent of the world's total art market, behind the United States (which accounts for 34 percent of the world's art market). Another transformation driving the growth of the Chinese art market is the rise of a clientele no longer mostly European or American. New fortunes from countries once thought of as poor often prefer non-Western art; a large gallerist in the field has offices in both New York and Beijing, but clients mainly hailing from Latin America, Asia and the Middle East.

One of the areas that has revived art concentration and also commercialized the industry is the 798 Art District in Dashanzi of Beijing. The artist Zhang Xiaogang sold a 1993 painting for US$2.3 million in 2006, which included blank faced Chinese families from the Cultural Revolution era, while Yue Minjun's work Execution in 2007 was sold for a then record of nearly $6 million at Sotheby's. Collectors including Stanley Ho, the owner of the Macau Casinos, investment manager Christopher Tsai, and casino developer Steve Wynn, would capitalize on the art trends. Items such as Ming dynasty vases and assorted Imperial pieces were auctioned off.

Other art works were sold in places such as Christie's including a Chinese porcelain piece with the mark of the Qianlong Emperor sold for HKD $ $151.3 million. Sotheby's and Christie's act as major market platforms for classical Chinese porcelain art pieces to be sold, including Ming dynasty, Xuande mark and period (1426–35) Blue and White jar (Five-Clawed Dragon Print), which was auctioned for Approx. USD 19,224,491.2, through Christie's in Spring 2016 The International Herald Tribune reported that Chinese porcelains were fought over in the art market as "if there was no tomorrow".

A 1964 painting by Li Keran "All the Mountains Blanketed in Red" was sold for HKD $35 million. Auctions were also held at Sotheby's where Xu Beihong's 1939 masterpiece "Put Down Your Whip" sold for HKD $72 million. The industry is not limited to fine arts, as many other types of contemporary pieces were also sold. In 2000, a number of Chinese artists were included in Documenta and the Venice Biennale of 2003. China now has its own major contemporary art showcase with the Venice Biennale. Fuck Off was a notorious art exhibition which ran alongside the Shanghai Biennial Festival in 2000 and was curated by independent curator Feng Boyi and contemporary artist Ai Weiwei.

Museums
 National Art Museum of China (Beijing)
 Palace Museum (Forbidden City, Beijing)
 China Art Museum (Shanghai)
 Power Station of Art (Shanghai)
 National Palace Museum (Taipei, Taiwan)

See also
 798 Art Zone
 Chinese fine art
 Chinese ceramics
 Chinese painting
Chinese jade
Chinese papercut

Chinese dance
Chinese opera 
Chinese drama

 Chinese folk art
 Eastern art history
 History of China
 Four Olds
 List of Chinese cultural relics forbidden to be exhibited abroad
 List of Chinese women artists
 Fruit pit carving
Tian-tsui 
Jue
Jian
Oil paper umbrella
Wuxia

References

Additional sources 

 Edmund Capon and Mae Anna Pang, Chinese Paintings of the Ming and Qing Dynasties, Catalogue, 1981, International Cultural Corporation of Australia Ltd.
 Rawson, Jessica (ed). The British Museum Book of Chinese Art, 2007 (2nd edn), British Museum Press, 
Sickman, Laurence, in: Sickman L. & Soper A., The Art and Architecture of China, Pelican History of Art, 3rd ed 1971, Penguin (now Yale History of Art), LOC 70-125675
MSN Encarta (Archived 2009-10-31)
The Columbia Electronic Encyclopedia
SHiNE Art Space Gallery

Further reading
Barnhart, Richard M., et al. Three Thousand Years of Chinese Painting. Wadsworth Atheneum Museum of Art: 2002. .
Chi, Lillian, et al. A Dictionary of Chinese Ceramics. Sun Tree Publishing: 2003. .
Clunas, Craig. Art in China. Oxford University Press: 1997. .

Gesterkamp, Lennert. The Heavenly Court: Daoist Temple Painting in China, 1200–1400. Brill 2011. .
Gowers, David, et al. Chinese Jade from the Neolithic to the Qing. Art Media Resources: 2002. .
Harper, Prudence Oliver. China: Dawn Of A Golden Age (200–750 AD). Yale University Press: 2004. .

Little, Stephen, et al. Taoism and the Arts of China. University of California Press: 2000. .
Mascarelli, Gloria, and Robert Mascarelli. The Ceramics of China: 5000 BC to 1900 AD. Schiffer Publishing: 2003. .
Sturman, Peter Charles. Mi Fu: Style and the Art of Calligraphy in Northern Song China. Yale University Press: 2004. .
Sullivan, Michael. The Arts of China. Fourth edition. University of California Press: 2000. .
Tregear, Mary. Chinese Art. Thames & Hudson: 1997. .
Valenstein, S. (1998). A handbook of Chinese ceramics, Metropolitan Museum of Art, New York.  .

Wang, Jianjiang, and Wynn, Keaton. Bie-Modern: Works and Commentary. China Social Science Press: 2018
Watson, William. The Arts of China to AD 900. Yale University Press: 1995. .
 S. Diglio, Urban Development and Historic Heritage Protection in Shanghai, in Fabio Maniscalco ed., "Web Journal on Cultural Patrimony", 1, 2006

External links

 The Final Frontier – Chinese contemporary art at LUX Mag
 Chinese art, calligraphy, painting, ceramics, carving at China Online Museum
 Art History of Chinese calligraphy, painting, and seal making
 China the Beautiful – Chinese Art and Literature Introductions & art classics texts
 Gallery of China – Traditional Chinese Art Essay on Chinese art from Neolithic to communist times
 Fine Chinese Art And Chinese Painting The Chinese Ancient Paintings